Lip Lock is the fourth studio album by American rapper Eve. The album, her first in eleven years, was released on May 14, 2013, by From The Rib Music and distributed by RED Distribution. The album features guest appearances from Gabe Saporta, Dawn Richard, Missy Elliott, Snoop Dogg, Chrisette Michele, Juicy J, and Pusha T among others. The album was supported with the singles "Make It Out This Town" and "Eve", in addition to the promotional single "She Bad Bad". 

Lip Lock was met with generally positive reviews from music critics. The album debuted at number 46 on the US Billboard 200 chart, with first-week sales of 9,000 copies.

Background
In 2007, Eve began working on a new album titled Here I Am. In May 2007, XXL magazine profiled six recorded tracks from Here I Am; five of them being produced by Swizz Beatz, including the singles "Tambourine" and "Give It to You" (featuring Sean Paul). Another song showcased, produced by Pharrell Williams of The Neptunes, was "All Night Long", a song where Eve sings as opposes to rapping. In July 2007, XXL published a review of Here I Am, rating it an L in its "shoe size" rating system ranging from S to XXL. However the album ran into a series of delays due to corporate change at the record label and discontent with the lackluster success of the first and second singles, "Tambourine", released in April 2007, and "Give It to You" (featuring Sean Paul), released during the summer.
The project was delayed to September 11, 2007 and then October 16, 2007 but it was never released. Problems at her label, Interscope Records, were responsible for the multiple delays. Due to the delays, the album was often reworked, and multiple times the album was renamed from Here I Am to Flirt and finally to Lip Lock. In an interview with New York Post, it was revealed under the title Here I Am the album had actually been completed; however, both times Interscope shelved the project.

On January 10, 2010, Eve announced on her Twitter that she left Interscope, saying: "Let me tell u what happened with music so ya’ll don’t think I quit." she told her followers "Left Interscope, free agent now. Went back in re-doing music. Trust me." The album was then expected to be released during 2011, but it was delayed once again. In 2012, Eve decided she would release the album independently, creating her own label From The Rib Music, with distribution being handled through Sony/Red. She stated that there would be several buzz singles before the official single and said the album would have "hard street stuff", "radio singles' and 'stuff to listen to when you're feeling down". In a 2013, interview with Billboard, Eve said:
"One of the biggest things that I wanted to do on this album was make people realize why they fell in love with me in the first place and then take them on a journey to where I am now musically. My ear is different but I think people will recognize me. I think you'll hear that I'm in a happy place. I miss my music. My hunger is different than the first time around".

Promotion and singles
In anticipation of the album, Eve released the song "She Bad Bad", produced by Jukebox, on October 9, 2012. It is her first release through her own independent record label, From the Rib. An accompanying music video for the promotional single was released on January 8, 2013. An official remix of "She Bad Bad", featuring rappers Juicy J and Pusha T, was released on January 23, 2013.

The album's lead single "Make It Out This Town", featuring guest vocals from Gabe Saporta of the synthpop band Cobra Starship, was released on February 26, 2013. The music video for the song premiered on Vevo on March 29, 2013. Eve performed the song for the first time on the May 3, 2013 episode of Late Night with Jimmy Fallon, along with Gabe Saporta and The Roots. She performed again the song on Good Morning America on May 14, 2013.  "Make It Out This Town" was released in the UK on May 26, 2013, trailing Lip Lock by one week.

In an interview on Rap-Up TV, Eve confirmed that the second official single would be the track "EVE" featuring Jamaican reggae artist Miss Kitty. The music video for the song was shot in London in February and premiered on BET on April 29, 2013. The day after the single was officially released. Eve performed the song on the late night talk show Conan on June 26, 2013.

In September 2013, Eve said she was choosing between "Keep Me from You" featuring Dawn Richard and "Mama in the Kitchen" with Snoop Dogg as the album's third single, but eventually no more singles were released.

Critical reception

Lip Lock was met with generally favorable reviews from music critics. At Metacritic, which assigns a weighted mean rating out of 100 to reviews from mainstream critics, the album received an average score of 62, based on 8 reviews, which indicates "generally favorable reviews". David Jeffries of AllMusic stated, "If Lip Lock isn't mean enough, well, neither is Eve. She's sweeter than before and musically more adventurous. It's just a shame she burned up the title Eve-Olution on that previous release." Julianne Escobedo Shepherd of Spin said, "Lip Lock may not be the best rap album of 2013, but it's interesting, and it's honest. After 11 years, that's a respectable way to ride out." Edwin Ortiz of HipHopDX said, "Seeing Eve return is a welcoming sight, and while unexpected, the experimental arrangements of her new project can be written off as just that. The heart of the issue with Lip Lock is that Eve hasn’t restored the command she once had, which subsequently allows these new sounds to lead her down a road of uncertainty. Eve’s maturation as a person has been obtained through time; it may take more before her music catches up." Lauren Martin of Fact stated, "Eve doesn’t dwell on the past with underhand bitterness or glassy-eyed nostalgia. Considering it’s been eleven years, there’s a pointedly absent element of story-telling about her hiatus which leaves the listener wanting more, yet Eve was never held up as a great lyricist and can’t really be bashed for not being one now. That’s not where her appeal lies. For all her success in commercial rap Eve is first and foremost a singer. It’s the fluidity of her appeal that she’s most keenly aware of, and this gets a triumphant finale on the remix of first single ‘She Bad Bad’ featuring Pusha T and Juicy J. As the three fellow comeback success stories stand side by side like this over what is certainly the album's most intense beat, even I feel smug listening to it. Eve is back, and she barely broke a sweat."

Steve Juon of RapReviews said, "Not every track on "Lip Lock is a home run, but she bats for the cycle here and only strikes out a few times ("Keep Me From You" is just too cotton candy for me). That's pretty incredible given how long she's been away. Who knows? Maybe she'll end up signing DMX to her imprint. She's got her life together, her businesses are successful, and she's still a bad bitch – but no longer afraid that showing her feminine side will make her come across soft or weak to a misogynistic audience. She can be the pitbull when necessary or the poodle when she feels like it and it's her flawless ability to switch it up that commands your attention." Jim Farber of New York Daily News stated, "To be specific, 11 long years have passed since the one-time Queen MC of Ruff Ryders Records completed a disc — 2002’s Eve-Olution. For the last six years, she’s been tinkering with tracks, leaking some out while experiencing increasing frustration with her label (Interscope). Small wonder the long-aborning Lip Lock appears on her own label. The lag may also explain why we’re hearing a more mature Eve here, less angry, more open to pop." Elias Leight of PopMatters said, "Eve tries to sound current—Lip Lock is consistently dense with electronics that nod to today’s pop-scape. No Neptunes and Dre here, but plenty of low frequency throbbing and high-pitched glitch noises. Eve doesn’t reach for the dance floor often, but this is hip-hop that acknowledges EDM and dub-step. There are a few songs that sound very different from the rest and instantly seem like outliers."

Commercial performance
The album debuted at number 46 on the US Billboard 200 chart, number 10 on the Independent Albums chart, and number 7 on the Top R&B/Hip Hop Albums chart with first-week sales of 9,000 copies. The album also charted on the ARIA Urban Albums chart in Australia at number 31.

Track listing

Notes
Producer Troy "Radio8" Johnson is styled as R8D!O
 denotes co-producer

Personnel
Adapted from Barnes & Noble.com.

Performers

Eve – primary artist
Juicy J – guest vocals
Pusha T – guest vocals
Chrisette Michele – guest vocals
Snoop Dogg – guest vocals
Missy Elliott – guest vocals
Dawn Richard
Claude Kelly – guest vocals
Propain – guest vocals
Miss Kitty – guest vocals
Nacho – guest vocals
Salaam Remi – bass, guitar, drums, keyboards

Technical credits

Bruce Carbone – executive producer
Fred Kevorkian – mastering
Salaam Remi – producer
Michael Woods – engineer
DJ Surge – producer
Swizz Beatz – producer
The Jukebox – producer
Nicholas Oshane – producer 
Trevor Niemann – art direction
Rico Love – producer
Claude Kelly – producer
Gleyder "Gee" Disla – engineer
Phil Scott – engineer
Shoddy – producer
Mike Piazza – engineer
Jon Jon – producer
Sander Van Der Waal – producer
Amarpaul Kalirai – art direction
James Chul Rim – engineer
Blac Elvis – producer
Travis "Viko" Blake – engineer
R8d!0 – producer
Lauren D'Elia – engineer
Felix Snow – producer, engineer
Den Fang – engineer
Mike Woods – engineer

Charts

Release history

References

2013 albums
Eve (rapper) albums
RED Distribution albums
Albums produced by Swizz Beatz